Iron citrate may refer to:

 Iron(II) citrate
 Iron(III) citrate